Behavior (Spanish: Conducta) is a 2014 Cuban drama film directed by Ernesto Daranas.

References

External links
 

Behavior